The Titiwangsa Mountains (Malay: Banjaran Titiwangsa, بنجرن تيتيوڠسا), also known as "Banjaran Besar" (Big Range) by locals, is the chain of mountains that forms the backbone of the Malay Peninsula. 
The northern section of the range is in southern Thailand, where it is known as Sankalakhiri Range.

The mountain range acts as a natural divider, dividing Peninsular Malaysia, as well as southernmost Thailand, into east and west coast regions. It is also the source of some major rivers of Peninsular Malaysia such as the Pahang, Perak, Kelantan, Klang and Muar. The length of mountain range is about 480 km from north to south.

Geology

The Titiwangsa Mountains is part of a suture zone that runs north-south, starting in Thailand at the Nan-Uttaradit suture zone (partly coincident with the Dien Bien Phu fault), and extending south towards Peninsular Malaysia (Bentong-Raub suture zone). The western half of the Titiwangsa Mountains in Peninsular Malaysia is an amalgamation of continental terranes known as Cimmeria or Indochina, whereas the eastern half is an amalgamation of continental terranes Sinoburmalaya or Sibumasu. These two halves of terranes were separated by the Paleo-Tethys Ocean.

The Cimmeria was separated from Gondwana around 400 mya during the Devonian and rifted towards Laurasia, the northeastern arm of Pangea. It attached to Laurasia completely around 280 mya during the Late Permian.

Sibumasu terranes on the other hand, only started to separate from Gondwana during the Early Permian and rifted towards Indochina. The collision of Sibumasu terranes and Indochina terranes during 200mya Late Triassic resulted in the closure of the Paleo-Tethys Ocean and formation of the modern Titiwangsa Mountain belts.

Geography

This mountain range is a part of the wider Tenasserim Hills system. It forms the southernmost section of the Indo-Malayan cordillera which runs from Tibet through the Kra Isthmus into the Malay Peninsula.

The Titiwangsa Mountains begins in the north as the Sankalakhiri Range, a prolongation of the Nakhon Si Thammarat Range which includes the smaller Pattani, Taluban, and Songkhla sub-ranges. The Sankalakhiri marks the border between the Southern Thailand provinces of Yala in west and Narathiwat in the east. Across the border into Malaysia, the main stretch of the range runs in a northwest-southeast orientation, straddling the borders between the west coast states of Perak and Selangor with Kelantan and Pahang on the eastern side of the peninsula. From the tripoint of Pahang, Selangor and Negeri Sembilan near Mount Nuang, it then transverses through the middle of the state of Negeri Sembilan, also a west coast state, thus dividing the state into two regions - western Negeri Sembilan, which consists of Seremban, Port Dickson and Rembau Districts, and eastern Negeri Sembilan, composed of the districts of Jelebu, Kuala Pilah, Jempol and Tampin - and ends in the south near Tampin, in the southern part of the state. Foothills, consisting of clusters of individual inselbergs, then extend further southeastwards into Melaka and Johor with its terminus at Mount Pulai.

The highest elevation is 2,183 m (7,162 ft) Gunung Korbu. On the Thai side the highest point is 1,533 m Ulu Titi Basah (ยูลูติติ บาซาห์), at the Thai/Malaysian border between Yala Province and Perak. In the southern foothills, the highest is 1,276 m Mount Ledang.

Features

Several popular tourist destinations such as Royal Belum, Cameron Highlands, Genting Highlands and Fraser's Hill are located on the range. 

Two of Malaysia's largest metropolitan areas are located along the western fringes of the mountain range, namely Greater Kuala Lumpur (ranked #1) and Kinta Valley (ranked #4). The Kinta Valley Geopark encompasses the entirety of Kinta Valley, where kegelkarst topography is prevalent. 

A number of roads cut through the Titiwangsa Forest Complex within the larger Central Forest Spine (CFS) conservation area.

Protected areas

Thailand
San Kala Khiri National Park
Budo - Su-ngai Padi National Park
Namtok Sai Khao National Park
Hala Bala Wildlife Sanctuary

Malaysia
Gunung Stong State Park
Royal Belum State Park
Taman Negara
Krau Wildlife Reserve
Kinta Valley National Geopark

Gallery

References

External links

Perak Tourism - Royal Belum State Park
Gunung Stong State Park
San Kara Khiri National Park
Budo - Su-ngai Padi National Park
Namtok Sai Khao National Park
Hala Bala Wildlife Sanctuary

 
Malay Peninsula
Mountain ranges of Thailand
Mountain ranges of Malaysia
Peninsular Malaysia
Southern Thailand